Eugene Lee "Gene" Davis (born November 17, 1945) is an American wrestler. He was born in Missoula, Montana. He was Olympic bronze medalist in Freestyle wrestling in 1976.

References
 M. Fessler, Faith and Wrestling: How the Role of a Wrestler Mirrors the Christian Life, (Bloomington, IN: Westbow Press, 2015). - originally published with Crossbooks Publishing in 2014.

1945 births
Living people
Sportspeople from Missoula, Montana
Wrestlers at the 1972 Summer Olympics
Wrestlers at the 1976 Summer Olympics
American male sport wrestlers
Olympic bronze medalists for the United States in wrestling
Medalists at the 1976 Summer Olympics
20th-century American people
21st-century American people